
Gmina Rytwiany is a rural gmina (administrative district) in Staszów County, Świętokrzyskie Voivodeship, in south-central Poland.

Demography 
According to the 2011 Poland census, there were 6,240 people residing in Rytwiany Commune, of whom 49.2% were male and 50.8% were female. In the commune, the population was spread out, with 20.7% under the age of 18, 38.4% from 18 to 44, 22.9% from 45 to 64, and 18% who were 65 years of age or older.
 Figure 1. Population pyramid of commune in 2010 – by age group and sex

Villages
Gmina Rytwiany contains the villages and settlements of Grobla, Kłoda, Niedziałki, Pacanówka, Podborek, Ruda, Rytwiany, Sichów Duży, Sichów Mały, Strzegom, Strzegomek, Święcica, Sydzyna, Szczeka and Tuklęcz.

Neighbouring gminas
Gmina Rytwiany is bordered by the gminas of Łubnice, Oleśnica, Osiek, Połaniec, Staszów and Tuczępy.

References

External links
Polish official population figures 2006

Rytwiany
Staszów County